Gulak (also Romanized as Gūlak; also known as Golak) is a village in Deylaman Rural District, Deylaman District, Siahkal County, Gilan Province, Iran. At the 2006 census, its population was 466, in 129 families.

References 

Populated places in Siahkal County